Paragylla albovenosa is a moth of the subfamily Arctiinae. It was described by Tessmann in 1928. It is found in Peru.

References

Lithosiini
Moths described in 1928